Hrvoje Babec (born 28 July 1999) is a Croatian professional footballer who plays as a midfielder for Riga in the Latvian Higher League.

Career

Early career
Born in Virovitica, Babec grew up in the nearby village of Brezik, traveling to train with Virovitica. He was noted early by scouts from bigger clubs and moved to NK Osijek. At the start of 2012 Babec then moved to the Hypo-Limač football academy, run by former Croatia internationals Petar Krpan and Matko Babić. After winning the national amateur club U-17 championship with the team, still 15 years old, he was scouted by foreign scouts and went to train with the Belgian RFC Seraing, and, since he couldn't be signed by them, moved forward after half a year later to France, to join the academy of RFC Seraing's partner club, FC Metz.

In Metz, Babec would go on to become the captain of the FC Metz U-19 team, getting his first taste of senior football, playing for Metz II. In 2018, following managerial advice, Babec left France, and went on trial with Dinamo Zagreb B, but the transfer fell through. In September 2018, then, looking for minutes, Babec moved to the Croatian third-tier club Vihor Jelisavac for one season.

HNK Gorica
On 14 July 2019, he signed with Gorica. Babec made his professional debut with Gorica in a 1–1 Croatian First Football League win over NK Inter Zaprešić on 20 July 2019.

International career
Babec was born in Croatia, and was called up to represent the Croatia U21 at the 2021 UEFA European Under-21 Championship.

References

External links
 
 
 
 

1999 births
Living people
Sportspeople from Virovitica
Croatian footballers
Croatia youth international footballers
Association football midfielders
HNK Gorica players
FC Metz players
Croatian Football League players
Championnat National 2 players
Croatian expatriate footballers
Croatian expatriate sportspeople in France
Expatriate footballers in France
Croatia under-21 international footballers